Slavko Brankov (19 May 1951 – 8 August 2006) was a Croatian film, theatre and television actor of Serb descent.

Career 
He graduated at the Zagreb Academy of Dramatic Art in 1976. In 1971, he started his acting career in one of Zagreb's most popular theaters, "Gavella". As result of his acting career, in 1992 he was awarded the Vladimir Nazor Award for a role of Calogiero di Spelta in drama "Velika magija". He was also awarded the Croatian Radio Television Award for playing the character of "Crni Džek" (Black Jack) in Smogovci, a highly popular children's TV series. He also had small roles in Croatian films like Ajmo žuti (Go, Yellow, 2001).

After the end of his marriage to actress Marina Nemet, Brankov indulged in an affair with a young girl, with whom he stayed until his death. Brankov died of a malignant disease that was treated at the Clinic for Lung Diseases in Zagreb.

References

External links

1951 births
2006 deaths
People from Varaždin
Serbs of Croatia
Academy of Dramatic Art, University of Zagreb alumni
Croatian male actors
Deaths from lung cancer in Croatia
Burials at Miroševac Cemetery